Kevaughn Connell (born 23 July 1986 in Port-of-Spain, Trinidad and Tobago), is a professional footballer from Trinidad and Tobago.

Career
Connell has previously played for Joe Public and San Juan Jabloteh in Trinidad and Tobago and AS Cannes and Sannois Saint-Gratien in France's Championnat National. He joined Nanchang Bayi of the Chinese Super League in March 2010 and was released in May.

International career
He made his international debut for the Trinidad and Tobago national football team against Grenada on April 24, 2008 and also played in the friendly against England in June 2008.

References

External links

1983 births
Living people
Trinidad and Tobago international footballers
Trinidad and Tobago footballers
AS Cannes players
San Juan Jabloteh F.C. players
Joe Public F.C. players
North East Stars F.C. players
Central F.C. players
TT Pro League players
Entente SSG players
Trinidad and Tobago expatriates in China
Chinese Super League players
Shanghai Shenxin F.C. players
Expatriate footballers in China
Association football wingers